RPC-TV is a television network, and is headquartered in Panama City, Panama, with repeaters throughout the country. RPC is the oldest commercial TV station in Panama, airing imported shows, programming for kids, and local and international sporting events.

History 
Between 1956 and 1960, television was an exclusive privilege of the Panama Canal Zone, with SCN's broadcasts in English on Channel 8 being aimed at military and civilian residents. This changed on 14 March 1960 when RPC Television becomes the first television channel of Panama, changing the city life of all Panamanians. The experience and prestige achieved by Fernando Eleta with his company, Radio Programas Continentales (RPC) has been predicted since 1951, and it wouldn't take long before it managed to bring television to Panama. After two years of hard work, difficulties and risks, on March 14, 1960, RPC Television broke into city life with the broadcast of its first signal, beginning the era of television in Panama

References

External links 
 RPC Channel 4 official website

Television stations in Panama
Television channels and stations established in 1960
Mass media in Panama City